All This and World War II is a 1976 musical documentary directed by Susan Winslow. It juxtaposes Beatles songs covered by a variety of musicians with World War II newsreel footage and 20th Century Fox films, in a manner meant by the filmmakers to be similar to the 1975 documentary Brother, Can You Spare a Dime? The film was severely mauled by critics and lasted just two weeks in cinemas before being pulled.

Cast
The film featured clips from the Nazi Germany army newsreels, various films from 20th Century Fox and other studios, as well as other propaganda films featuring Jack Benny, Edgar Bergen & Charlie McCarthy, Milton Berle, Humphrey Bogart, Richard Burton, Neville Chamberlain, Dwight D. Eisenhower, Clark Gable, Adolf Hitler, Bob Hope, Joseph P. Kennedy, Laurel and Hardy, James Mason, Benito Mussolini, Franklin Delano Roosevelt, Joseph Stalin, and James Stewart.

Production
The film was researched by Tony Palmer who had previously released All My Loving, a history of 1960s music (1968), and the 17-part rock history documentary All You Need Is Love: The Story of Popular Music. He remade the film in 2016 as The Beatles and World War II.

The musical director was Lou Reizner, who also produced the soundtrack album.

Although it was rumoured that Terry Gilliam turned down the offer to contribute animation to the documentary, Russ Regan, who conceived the film, has stated that Gilliam was never asked.

Reception
Critics savaged the movie with gusto, audiences stayed away, and Fox promptly yanked the film from release. The reviewer in the New York Daily News wrote that the film's PG rating had to have stood for "Positively Ghastly". It appeared out of competition at Cannes in 1977, has occasionally been shown at film festivals, and even on American cable TV.

BBC2 gained the film a small cult following in the UK when it was screened as part of their fifteen-hour theme night "Rock Around The Clock", which ran from the afternoon of 27 August 1983, into the early hours of the next day.

On June 1, 2007, the film played a single midnight show at Landmark's Nuart Theatre in Los Angeles.

Distribution
The film has never been officially released on home video or DVD, but bootleg copies of the film are available from several collector-to-collector resources. A fairly high-quality transfer is also available as an unofficial DVD release. A version of this film was released as a DVD plus two CD set by Gonzo Multimedia – TPDVD191 in 2016, entitled The Beatles and World War II, but this is a revised edition by original director Tony Palmer, using different footage and a different soundtrack.

Soundtrack

The original intention of the filmmakers was to use actual Beatles music in the film. The decision to use other artists covering Beatles music was made by the film's producers after they realised additional money could be made through a soundtrack album. The decision was a sound one, as the soundtrack actually generated more revenue than the film. The album was released on 25 October 1976 and the film was released on the 11th November 1976.

The album reached number 23 on the UK Albums Chart, with a total of seven weeks on that listing, and number 48 on the Billboard Top 200. It also made number 17 on the Dutch album charts and number 37 on the New Zealand album charts. The soundtrack is notable for featuring the solo recording debut of Peter Gabriel, formerly of Genesis, singing "Strawberry Fields Forever".

The LP was also released in 1979 with the title The Songs Of John Lennon & Paul McCartney Performed By The World's Greatest Rock Artists, and two of the tracks ("Let It Be" performed by Leo Sayer and "Because" performed by Lynsey de Paul) were released on the Beatles cover version CD album With A Little Help that was issued in Europe in 1991.

The album was finally released on CD in 2006 on the Hip-O Select label and again in 2015 as a limited-issue release on the Culture Factory label, complete with the original gatefold sleeve.

Single releases
 Elton John’s rendition of "Lucy in the Sky with Diamonds", when previously released as a single in 1974, became a US and Canadian number-one hit.
 Rod Stewart’s version of "Get Back" was subsequently released and became a UK hit single (#11).
 Ambrosia's cover of "Magical Mystery Tour" reached #39 on the US Billboard Hot 100.

Track listing
All songs by Lennon–McCartney.

Personnel
 Barry Gibb – vocals
 Robin Gibb – vocals
 Maurice Gibb – vocals
 Nicky Hopkins – piano
 Les Hurdle – bass
 Barry Morgan – drums
 Ronnie Verrell – drums
 Wil Malone – orchestral arrangement
 Harry Rabinowitz – conductor
 David Measham – conductor

Charts

See also
 List of artists who have covered the Beatles
 Across the Universe, a 2007 musical film that also used the concept of using Beatles songs to tell a story
 Sgt. Pepper's Lonely Hearts Club Band, a 1978 film featuring Bee Gees covers of Beatles songs
 Brother, Can You Spare a Dime?, a 1975 documentary that did a similar thing, but with the correct music for the period, which may have inspired All this and World War II
 The Atomic Cafe, a darkly satirical 1982 Cold War documentary similar in content

References

External links
 
 
 Original theatrical trailer

Compilation films
1976 documentary films
1976 films
20th Century Fox films
American documentary films
Documentary films about World War II
The Beatles in film
Jukebox musical films
Collage film
Riva Records albums
20th Century Fox Records soundtracks
1970s English-language films
1970s American films